Lloyd John O'Neil AM (17 July 1928 - 27 February 1992) was an Australian publisher. He was involved with a number of different publishing firms and imprints during his career. He served as president of the Australian Book Publishers Association from 1969 to 1971.

Early life
O'Neil was born in Melbourne on 17 July 1928, the son of Eunice Ellen (née Lloyd) and Louis Joseph O'Neil. His father was a wool classer and his mother was a professional pianist. He attended Caulfield Grammar School until 1944.

Career
After leaving school, O'Neil moved to Sydney and began working with Angus & Robertson as a buyer, becoming head of art books. He left Angus & Robertson in 1951 and the following year joined Cassell as a travelling salesman. Settling in Brisbane, in 1955 he was recruited by bookseller Brian Clouston to run schoolbook publisher Jacaranda Press. He left Jacaranda in 1959 and moved back to Melbourne to establish his own company, Lansdowne Press.

In December 1967, O'Neil was appointed by the McEwen government as deputy chairman of the newly created National Literature Board of Review, to advise the Minister for Customs and Excise on literary censorship.

O'Neil reportedly published "more than 1000 Australian titles" during his career.

Personal life
O'Neil married Janet Twigg-Patterson in 1953, with whom he had four daughters. The couple separated in 1973 and divorced in 1978. The following year, he married fellow publisher Anne O'Donovan, with whom he had a son and a daughter. His youngest child Clare O'Neil was elected to federal parliament in 2013, while another daughter Helen O'Neil has served as executive director of the Council for the Humanities, Arts and Social Sciences and on the board of the Film Finance Corporation Australia.

O'Neil was diagnosed with bowel cancer in 1987. He was appointed Member of the Order of Australia (AM) in 1991 and died on 27 February 1992 at the age of 63. Following his death, the ABPA established the Lloyd O'Neil Award in his honour, to be presented at the Australian Book Industry Awards for "exceptional long service to the industry".

References

1928 births
1992 deaths
Businesspeople from Melbourne
People educated at Caulfield Grammar School
Deaths from colorectal cancer
Members of the Order of Australia
Australian publishers (people)